Bruce Friderichs (born 27 September 1979) is a South African former cricketer. He played in two first-class and thirteen List A matches for Eastern Province from 2001 to 2005.

See also
 List of Eastern Province representative cricketers

References

External links
 

1979 births
Living people
South African cricketers
Eastern Province cricketers
Sportspeople from Qonce